Brent Sherwin (born 20 March 1978) is an Australian former professional rugby league footballer. Sherwin plays in the Illawarra Carlton League which is an indirect feeder league to the St George Illawarra Dragons. He plays as a half-back. Sherwin previously played for the Catalans Dragons, Castleford Tigers (Heritage № 883), the Canterbury-Bankstown Bulldogs and has also been represented for City Origin.

Sherwin played for Canterbury-Bankstown from 1999 to 2007. He was almost successful in obtaining the Dally M Award in 2002 but was narrowly beaten by Andrew Johns, despite Johns gaining points for a game in which he was sent off.

While he occasionally was demoted for poor form, Sherwin played a vital role in Canterbury's 2002 17-game winning streak and the 2004 premiership win.  A handy goalkicker, Sherwin was the top grade half from 2002-2007.

Background
Sherwin was born in Greenacre, New South Wales, Australia.

Canterbury-Bankstown (1996–2007) 
Sherwin joined Canterbury as a five-eighth with pinpoint goal kicking. He was a regular member for the under 19's squad and played in the Preliminary Final against the Penrith Panthers which they lost.

In 1998, Sherwin was playing on the wing for the reserve side. He broke the club's record for most points scored in a reserve team for a season with 170 points. He played in the eventual premiership victory over Parramatta.

In 1999, he started playing half-back for the reserve side. Due to the injury of Ricky Stuart, Sherwin got his first opportunity in first grade football.

In 2000, Sherwin became a regular member of the Canterbury-Bankstown squad, playing at five-eighth.

In 2001, Brent continued his success in the top grade, mainly playing off the bench. Due to injury, Sherwin was unable to play in the Semi Final against St. George Illawarra.

In 2002, he had a great season as he became the regular half back for the Canterbury Side, and got his first taste of representative football, As he was selected to play for City Origin.

In 2003,  he was again a regular member of the team. He played in the Preliminary Final, But lost against eventual runners-up the Sydney Roosters.

Sherwin played halfback for Canterbury in their 2004 NRL grand final victory over cross-city rivals, the Sydney Roosters.

In 2005, Sherwin's season was cut short due to a season-ending injury.

In 2006, he came back with great form and played in the Preliminary Final which they lost to eventual premiers the Brisbane Broncos.

In 2007, Sherwin started the season in the lower grades, but early in the season returned to top grade and played for the remainder of the season. He played in the elimination final against arch-rivals the Parramatta Eels, but Canterbury went down 25-6 ending their season, which would also turn out to be his last game playing for the club.

Castleford Tigers (2007–2010)
On 8 November 2007, Canterbury-Bankstown announced that Sherwin had been released from the remainder of his contract. Sherwin signed with the English club, Castleford Tigers, on a three-year contract with the English club.

He played 21 times for Castleford in 2008. He suffered niggling injuries through the campaign and the tigers fans were never able to see his best ability. He was hoping for full fitness for 2009 and a strong campaign where he would link up in the halves with Rangi Chase.

He started the 2009 season in great form before suffering injury again where he missed 11 games. He has returned for the final 3 games where Cas were hoping to achieve a play off place.

Catalans Dragons 2010 

He signed for the Catalans Dragons for the remainder of the 2010 season in a shock switch from Castleford.

Later years 
Sherwin returned to Australia in 2011, playing in the Illawarra Carlton League which is an indirect feeder league to the St George Illawarra Dragons.

He was appointed assistant coach for the Camden Rams in 2013 in the Group 6 Rugby League competition, working under former Bulldogs teammate Mitch Newton.

References

External links
Profile at castigers.com
Castleford Tigers profile
Brent Sherwin NRL Stats
Brent Sherwin Bulldogs profile
SL stats

1978 births
Living people
Australian rugby league players
Canterbury-Bankstown Bulldogs players
Castleford Tigers players
Catalans Dragons players
New South Wales City Origin rugby league team players
Rugby league halfbacks